Walchsee is a lake in Kufstein District in both Walchsee and Kössen municipalities, Tyrol, Austria.

Its surface area of  makes it the fourth largest natural waterbody in the state.

See also 
List of lakes of Austria

External links

References

Kufstein District
Lakes of Tyrol (state)
Kaiser Mountains